Socorro Island is a small volcanic island in the Revillagigedo Islands, a Mexican possession lying  off the country's western coast. It is the largest of the four islands of the Revillagigedo Archipelago. The last eruption was in 1993.

Geology 

Socorro Island is the emerged summit of a massive, predominately submarine shield volcano.

The island is part of the northern Mathematicians Ridge, a mid-ocean ridge that became largely inactive 3.5 million years ago when activity moved to the East Pacific Rise. All four islands along with the many seamounts on the ridge are post-abandonment alkaline volcanoes. Socorro Island is unusual in that it is the only dominantly silicic peralkaline volcanic island in the Pacific Ocean.

It most recently erupted in late Januaryearly February, 1993, which was a submarine flank eruption off the coast from Punta Tosca. An earlier eruption was on May 21, 1951; earlier eruptions probably occurred in 1905, 1896 and 1848. The initial volcanic event probably occurred in 3090 BC +/- 500 years. Mount Evermann (Spanish: Cerro Evermann) is the name given to the summit dome complex, in honor of ichthyologist Barton Warren Evermann. The island's surface is broken by furrows, small craters, and numerous ravines, and covered in lava domes, lava flows and cinder cones.

There is a naval station, established in 1957, with a population of 250 (staff and families), living in a village with a church, that stands on the western side of Bahia Vargas Lozano, a small cove with a rocky beach, about 800 meters east of Cabo Regla, the southernmost point of the island. The station is served by a dock, a local helipad and Isla Socorro airport, located six kilometers to the north. There is a fresh water spring about 5 km northwest of Cabo Regla, at the shoreline of Ensenada Grayson (or Caleta Grayson), an inlet. This is brackish and sometimes covered by the sea at high tide.

History

No evidence of human habitation on Socorro exists before its discovery by Spanish explorer  and his crew on 19 December 1533, who named it Santo Tomás ("St Thomas Island"). In 1542, Ruy López de Villalobos, while exploring new routes across the Pacific, rediscovered Inocentes and renamed it Isla Anublada ("Cloudy Island") due to the clouds frequently forming on the northern slopes of Mount Evermann, and again in 1608, Martín Yañez de Armida, in charge of another expedition, visited Santo Tomás and changed its name to Isla Socorro after Our Lady of Perpetual Help (Virgen del Perpetuo Socorro).

At the beginning of the twentieth century, Barton Warren Evermann, director of the California Academy of Sciences in San Francisco promoted the scientific exploration of the island. The most comprehensive biological collections were obtained at this time. The volcano on Socorro was renamed in his honor.

Archie Smith, an American laborer from San Diego, was marooned on the island for one month in 1929 before being rescued by a passing fishing boat. This was because the expedition that brought him to the island to shear wild sheep, returned to port for supplies, but went bankrupt and could not return.

In September 1997, Hurricane Linda passed near the island near peak intensity causing minor damage to meteorological instruments on the island.

Ecology

The lowlands of Socorro – except on the northern, more humid side – are covered with thick shrubland, consisting mainly of endemic Croton masonii and a cactus, probably Engelmann's prickly pear (Opuntia engelmannii). Above  and on the northern side, a richer vegetation occurs. This includes small trees such as Ficus cotinifolia, black cherry (Prunus serotina), and the endemic Guettarda insularis, which bear epiphytic orchids (Epidendrum nitens, E. rigidum and the endemic Pleurothallis unguicallosa).

The native land fauna is depauperate, with birds predominating and mammals absent. There is one endemic species of iguanid lizard (Urosaurus auriculatus) and the land crab Johngarthia oceanica which also occurs on Clipperton Island.

Sheep, cats and rodents were introduced to the island by human activity; more recently, the locust Schistocerca piceifrons has also established itself on the island. Unlike the mammals on Guadalupe Island or Clarión, their impact on the local flora was minor, but cat predation has had a drastic effect since the mid-1970s due to the fauna's island tameness, and the locusts that swarm twice a year seriously damage vegetation during that time. There have been no recorded extinctions of plants on Socorro; several birds have been drastically affected by cat predation however, and one taxon, the Socorro dove, has gone extinct in the wild.

Socorro is an important breeding location for several seabirds, many of which have here one of their north(east)ernmost breeding colonies. The present status of these birds is not well known, and they presumably have suffered from cat predation. In 1953, the following taxa were present:
 Wedge-tailed shearwater, Puffinus pacificus (or Ardenna pacifica)
 Western red-billed tropicbird, Phaethon aethereus mesonauta – breeding suspected but not verified
 Nazca booby, Sula granti – breeding suspected but not verified
 Northeast Pacific brown booby, Sula leucogaster brewsteri – breeding suspected but not verified
 East Pacific great frigatebird, Fregata minor ridgwayi – breeding suspected but not verified; a doubtfully distinct subspecies
 East Pacific sooty tern, Onychoprion fuscatus crissalis – a doubtfully distinct subspecies
 East Pacific brown noddy, Anous stolidus ridgwayi

Non-endemic landbirds and shorebirds occur mostly as vagrants or use the island as a stopover during migration; the northern mockingbird became established in the late 20th century. Among those that are recorded not infrequently are great blue heron, Hudsonian curlew, spotted sandpiper and wandering tattler. Unlike the situation on smaller and more isolated Clarión, wind-blown or vagrant birds seem to constitute the bulk of the recorded species, including brown pelican, osprey, peregrine falcon, semipalmated plover, willet, sanderling, belted kingfisher and buff-bellied pipit. It may be that this puzzling observation is due to the presence of the red-tailed hawks and cats, which has at least made the local Urosaurus more wary than its relative on Clarión, and might deter passing birds from stopping on Socorro.

Endemism
Being the largest of the Revillagigedo Islands and closer to mainland than Clarion, Socorro sports a rich array of endemic taxa, mainly plants and landbirds as well as lizards. Some are threatened due to the presence of feral cats.

Animals

 Socorro parakeet, Aratinga brevipes (endangered)
 Socorro red-tailed hawk, Buteo jamaicensis socorroensis
 Socorro common ground dove, Columbina passerina socorroensis
 Socorro elf owl, Micrathene whitneyi graysoni (probably extinct since c. 1970)
 Socorro mockingbird, Mimodes graysoni (critically endangered)
 Socorro yellow-crowned night heron, Nycticorax violaceus gravirostris (or Nyctanassa violacea gravirostris)
 Socorro tropical parula, Parula pitiayumi graysoni
 Socorro towhee, Pipilo (maculatus) socorroensis
 Townsend's shearwater, Puffinus auricularis (critically endangered; recently extirpated from San Benedicto and probably Clarión)
 Socorro wren, Troglodytes sissonii (near threatened)
 Socorro dove, Zenaida graysoni (extinct in the wild)
 Urosaurus auriculatus (endangered)

Plants

 Acalypha umbrosa
 Aegopogon solisii
 Aristida vaginata
 Aristolochia socorroensis
 Bidens socorrensis
 Botrychium socorrense
 Castilleja socorrensis
 Cestrum pacificum
 Coreocarpus insularis
 Croton masonii
 Erigeron socorrensis
 Eupatorium pacificum
 Guettarda insularis
 Hypericum eastwoodianum
 Ilex socorroensis
 Lantana involucrata var. socorrensis
 Lepechinia hastata ssp. socorrensis
 Meliosma nesites
 Paspalum longum
 Peperomia socorronis
 Physalis mimulus
 Pleurothallis unguicallosa
 Salvia pseudomisella
 Sida nesogena
 Sideroxylon socorrense (Vulnerable)
 Verbena sphaerocarpa
 Vernonia littoralis

Brickellia peninsularis var. amphithalassa, Cheilanthes peninsularis var. insularis, Nicotiana stocktonii, Spermacoce nesiotica and Zapoteca formosa ssp. rosei are near-endemics, being restricted to Socorro and Clarión. Whether Teucrium townsendii ssp. affine is the same plant as those on San Benedicto is not conclusively determined.

Visiting information
Socorro Island is a popular scuba diving destination known for underwater encounters with dolphins, sharks, manta rays and other pelagic animals. Since there is no public airport on the island, divers visit here on live-aboard dive vessels. The most popular months are between November and May when the weather and seas are calmer. November to December are popular months to visit for a good chance to dive with whale sharks. January and February are popular months to scuba dive with humpback whales as they are then migrating through the Revillagigedo archipelago.

See also
 List of volcanoes in Mexico

Notes

References

External links

 Socorro Endemic Bird Area (BirdLife International)

Islands of Colima
Pacific islands of Mexico
Volcanoes of Colima
Volcanoes of the Pacific Ocean
Polygenetic shield volcanoes
Underwater diving sites in Mexico
Endemic Bird Areas